Jaroslav Chana (19 December 1899 – 26 September 2000) was a Czechoslovak football goalkeeper who played six seasons for SK Slavia Prague, earning nearly 200 caps with the team. He also had two international caps for the Czechoslovakia national football team in 1921. He was born in Vršovice, Prague. He later ran a car repair shop and, after the 1948 Czechoslovak coup d'état, worked with a state insurance company as a liquidator. He died in September 2000, at the age of 100.

References 

1899 births
2000 deaths
Czech centenarians
Men centenarians
Czechoslovak footballers
Association football goalkeepers
Czechoslovakia international footballers
Footballers from Prague